Frank Thayer Merrill (December 14, 1848October 12, 1936) was an American artist and illustrator. He is best known for his drawings for the first illustrated edition of Louisa May Alcott's novel Little Women, published in 1880. Over a five-decade career, he illustrated a wide variety of works for adults and children.

Early life and education
Frank Thayer Merrill was born on December 14, 1848, to George William Merrill (1824–1879) and Sarah Rose Merrill (1822–1895) in Roxbury, Massachusetts. Both parents were natives of Westbrook, Maine. His father was descended from Nathaniel Merrill, who emigrated from England to Massachusetts in 1635. His mother was a direct descendant of John Alden, of the Mayflower crew. Frank had four younger siblings: Clara Alden (1851–1902), Emma L. (1857–1939), George Arthur (1859–1932) and Mary B. (1862–1956).

He attended local public schools, graduating from either Roxbury High School or Boston Latin School  sources disagree. (The 1865 state census lists the 16-year-old Merrill's occupation as "clerk" rather than "student".) His mother "greatly encouraged Merrill's artistic development and from her much of his talent is said to have come". Merrill participated in the free drawing program at the Lowell Institute from 1864 to 1875, and entered the school of drawing and painting at the Boston Museum of Fine Arts in 1875.

Career
In 1870, Merrill established a studio in Roxbury where he dedicated himself to a career as an illustrator as well as painting in watercolor and oil. He traveled to Europe in 1884, painting and sketching in France, Switzerland, Belgium, The Netherlands and England.

He drew  on his observations of Parisian life along the Seine river to write a story titled Through the Heart of Paris. It appeared in the January 1886 issue of the children's magazine Wide Awake and was included in a collection of Wide Awake travel articles, Sights Worth Seeing by Those Who Saw Them, also published in 1886.

Collaboration with Louisa May Alcott

Merrill's first major commission was to illustrate a new edition of Little Women. Originally released in two volumes in 1868 and 1869, a single-volume revised edition was published in 1880 to capitalize on the book's popularity and to deter copyright violators. Merrill created over two hundred pen-and-ink drawings for the new edition.

In 2002, the Concord Museum in Concord, Massachusetts mounted an exhibition of sixty-five of Merrill's original drawings for Little Women, some with annotations by the author giving both praise and editorial direction.

Alcott was pleased with the final drawings, writing to her publisher:	

Merrill also illustrated some of Alcott's books re-issued after her death, including: An Old-Fashioned Girl (1898 Roberts Brothers edition) and Little Men (1904 Little, Brown & Co. edition).

Mark Twain and The Prince and the Pauper
Shortly after Little Women was published, Merrill was asked to supply illustrations for the first edition of The Prince and the Pauper (1881) by Mark Twain. He shared credit with John J. Harley and Ludvig Sandöe Ipsen for the 192 illustrations.  

Twain commented favorably on Merrill's drawings in letters to his publisher:

Other work

Over the course of his career, Merrill created thousands of illustrations for a wide variety of fiction and non-fiction for children and adults. Some of his earliest work appears in a history titled Pioneers in the Settlement of America published in 1877. He went on to illustrate a number of other histories, primarily for children, sharing his deep interest in American history, particularly the colonial and revolutionary eras. These include:
 Legends of ye Province House (1890) by Nathaniel Hawthorne
 The American History Story Book (1911) and Heroic Deeds of American Sailors (1917) by Albert F. Blaisdell and Francis K. Ball
 In the Days of Thomas Jefferson (1900) by Hezekiah Butterworth
 The Knitting of the Souls: A Tale of 17th Century Boston (1904) by Maude Clark Gay
 Prisoners of the Pirates: A Tale of the Massachusetts Bay Colony (1913) by Ruel Perley Smith

Many of the works Merrill contributed to were reissues of American and English classics: 
 Rip van Winkle (1888) and Tales of a Traveller (1897) by Washington Irving
 The Courtship of Miles Standish (1883) by Henry Wadsworth Longfellow
 Vanity Fair (1893) and The Mahogany Tree (1887) by William Makepeace Thackeray
 The Man without a Country (1900) by Edward Everett Hale
 Lorna Doone (1892) by R. D. Blackmore
 Adam Bede (1893) by George Eliot
 The Count of Monte Christo (1915) and a number of other romances by Alexandre Dumas.

He also supplied illustrations for contemporary, or popular, fiction:
 The Mysteries of Paris (1903) by Eugene Sue
 Love Me Little, Love Me Long (1910) by Charles Reade
 Hope Loring (1902) by Lillian Bell
 Omar, the Tentmaker (1922) by Nathan Haskell Dole
 The Yellow God, an Idol of Africa (1908) by H. Rider Haggard

Merrill specialized in children's books, or what might be called Young Adult fiction. Many were entries in multi-book series for which he provided illustrations for one or more volumes.
 Lynx-hunting (The Camping-Out series, vol IV) (1872) by Charles Asbury Stephens
 Captain January (1892) and Star Bright (1927) by Laura E. Richards
 A Boy's Adventure, or, The Strange Adventures of Ben Baker (1898) by Horatio Alger Jr.
 An Annapolis Plebe (1907) by Edward L. Beach Sr., the first in a series about naval life.
 The Six Little Pennypackers (1911) by Sophie Swett
 Mary Ware in Texas (1919) by Annie Fellowes Johnston
 The Young Wireless Operator with the Oyster Fleet (1922) by Lewis E. Theiss. Merrill illustrated nine of ten entries in the Wireless Patrol series.
 Lonely O'Malley (1924) by Arthur Stringer
 Merrylips (1925) by Beulah Marie Dix

Merrill displayed considerable skill as a calligrapher. His editions of two Christmas poems, Thackeray's The Mahogany Tree and A Christmas Carroll, written in 1622 by George Wither, are entirely rendered with full-page drawings, decorative elements and hand-lettered text.

Exhibitions

Merrill exhibited in a number of art galleries, including the Salmagundi Club in New York City. A Boston newspaper reviewed an 1885 exhibition of watercolors at Chase's Art Gallery.
(The Bromley Arms, which became the Donnithorne Arms in George Eliot's novel Adam Bede, was painted by Merrill when he was in England.)

Another newspaper review of a 1905 exhibition at Walter Rowland's galleries was also complimentary.

Crime in the book business
In 1914, Merrill appeared as a witness in a case of "larceny and conspiracy" regarding the sale of a collection of books. When asked his opinion of the illustrations in one of the books, he replied, "It's not a very gracious thing for one artist to criticize another but as I see this I will say it doesn't appeal to me". Merrill also stated that he was paid "a little in excess of $1,900" for illustrations made for editions of the collected works of Keats and Shelley, which were among the books involved in the lawsuit. He added that he was paid $60 for each of four drawings for books by Mark Twain, probably referring to a commission for four full-page illustrations for a new edition of The Prince and the Pauper which was published in 1899.

Personal life
Merrill married Jessie S. Aldrich (1858–1936) of Boston on December 14, 1881 at the Walnut Avenue (now Eliot) Congregational Church in Roxbury. The couple lived in Roxbury until 1886 when they moved to a newly built house and studio on Tremlett St. in the Codman Square neighborhood of Dorchester. Merrill worked out of this studio for the rest of his life.

The Merrills had four sons:
 Alden (1882–1957) SB in chemistry, MIT, 1906. Married Emeline L. Cook in Torrington, Connecticut, 1910. 
 Paul A. (1888–1891) Died of pneumonia and influenza.
 Philip Aldrich (1893–1972) Married Marion C. Hill (1897–1972)
 Roger (1894–1952)

A life-long resident of Boston, Merrill was active in the community. He gave talks to local groups on illustration and historic costuming, drawing on his experience collecting and restoring American antiques. In 1886, a charity event, "Music of the Centuries", was staged for the New England Conservatory. Merrill was credited for work on two tableaux: as artist for "Court of Charlemagne (A.D. 800)" and as artist and manager for "Cavaliers and Roundheads (A.D. 1645)". A Republican, he served as an inspector of elections for his city precinct. He was elected vice-president of the Corporation of Mount Pleasant Home for Aged Men and Women in 1908. Mrs. Merrill was also on the executive committee.

On December 14, 1931, Jessie and Frank Merrill celebrated their fiftieth wedding anniversary (which was also Frank's birthday) at the home where they had resided for 45 years, in the company of friends, and their three sons. Jessie died a few years later, followed by Frank within three months. Both were interred in the family plot at Forest Hills Cemetery in Jamaica Plain, Massachusetts.

Gallery

Notes and References

Notes

References

Sources

External links

 
 
 
 Works illustrated by Frank T. Merrill at HathiTrust
 Frank Thayer Merrill at the Dorchester Atheneum
 List of Merrill illustrations for Little Women held by the Concord Free Public Library

 

1848 births
1936 deaths
19th-century American artists
20th-century American artists
American illustrators
People from Dorchester, Massachusetts